Ariel Aisin-Gioro (born 23 December 1983) is a Chinese actress of Manchu ethnicity, remotely related to the ruling clan of the former Qing imperial dynasty, the Aisin-Gioro clan.

She is noted for her roles as Gesang Meiduo and Jin Xiaohui in the films A Tibetan Love Song (2010) and My Yanming Days (2011) respectively.

Biography

Ancestry
Ariel is the 14th generation descendant of Nurhaci of the Aisin Gioro house, the last imperial dynasty during Qing China.

Early life
Aisin-Gioro was born and raised in Daxing District, Beijing, where she studied at the Middle School affiliated to Beijing Dance Academy. She graduated from Beijing Film Academy, majoring in acting.

Acting career
Aisin-Gioro's first film role was uncredited appearance in the film The Rainbow Connection (2005).

In 2006, she starred in the romantic comedy film Love in Macau, alongside Alex Fong and Stephy Tang. She was nominated for Best Actress Award at the 1st Macau International Movie Festival.

In 2008, she appeared in the film Fit Lover, a romantic film starring Alec Su and Karena Lam. She also participated in Looking for Jackie and A Singing Fairy.

In 2010, Aisin-Gioro starred opposite Alec Su in A Tibetan Love Song, she won the Best Newcomer Award at the 2nd Macau International Movie Festival and Golden Phoenix Awards, and Best New Artist Award at the Chinese American Film Festival.

In 2011, she had a cameo appearance in The Founding of a Party, for which she won the Golden Phoenix Award.

For her role as Jin Xiaohui in My Yanming Days, Aisin-Gioro won the Best Actress Award at the Australia Chinese Film Festival and China Image Film Festival.

Filmography

Film

Drama
 Love in the Old Summer Palace

Awards

References

External links

1983 births
Living people
Manchu actresses
Beijing Film Academy alumni
Chinese television actresses
Chinese film actresses
21st-century Chinese actresses
Actresses from Beijing